Coober Pedy is a town in northern South Australia,  north of Adelaide on the Stuart Highway.  The town is sometimes referred to as the "opal capital of the world" because of the quantity of precious opals that are mined there. Coober Pedy is renowned for its below-ground dwellings, called "dugouts", which are built in this fashion due to the scorching daytime heat.

The name "Coober Pedy" is thought to derive from the Aboriginal term kupa-piti, which means "whitefellas' hole", but in 1975 the local Aboriginal people of the town adopted the name Umoona, which means "long life" and is also their name for the mulga tree.

In the 2016 Australian census, there were 1,762 people in Coober Pedy.

History 
Aboriginal peoples have a long-standing connection with the area. Coober Pedy is considered by the senior Western Desert people to be the traditional lands of the Arabana people country, but Kokatha and Yankunytjatjara people are also closely attached to some ceremonial sites in the area. The origin of the name of the town (decided in 1920) is thought to derive from the words in the Kokatha language, kupa piti, usually translated as "whitefella – hole in the ground", or guba bidi, "white man’s holes", relating to white people's mining activities (also reported as meaning "boys' waterhole" in some sources).  Further investigation into the words by linguists shows that kupa  may have originated from the Parnkalla language and that piti may be the Kokatha word specifically created for "quarry" (a white man's activity).

The first European explorer to pass near the site of Coober Pedy was Scottish-born John McDouall Stuart in 1858. The town was not established until after 1915, when the first opal was discovered by Wille Hutchison on 1 February of that year. Opal miners started moving in around 1916. The name of Coober Pedy was decided upon at a meeting in 1920, when a post office was established.

In July 1975 the local Aboriginal people of Coober Pedy adopted the name Umoona, which means "long life" and is also their name for the Acacia aneura, or mulga tree, which is plentiful in the area. The name has since been used for various establishments in the town.

Description
Coober Pedy is a small town about halfway between Adelaide and Alice Springs. Very little plant life exists in town due to the region's low rainfall, high cost of water, and lack of topsoil.

The harsh summer desert temperatures mean that many residents prefer to live in caves bored into the hillsides ("dugouts"). A standard three-bedroom cave home with lounge, kitchen, and bathroom can be excavated out of the rock in the hillside for a similar price to building a house on the surface. However, dugouts remain at a constant temperature, while surface buildings need air conditioning, especially during the summer months, when temperatures often exceed . The relative humidity rarely gets over 20% on these hot days, and the skies are usually cloud-free.

The town's water supply, managed by the District Council which operates a bore and associated treatment plant, comes from the Great Artesian Basin. Problems with ageing pipes, high water losses, and lack of subsidies contribute to consumer water charges being the highest in South Australia.

Mining

Opals
By 1999, there were more than 250,000 mine shaft entrances in the area and a law discouraged large-scale mining by allowing each prospector a  claim. Coober Pedy supplies most of the world's gem-quality opal; it has over 70 opal fields.

Other minerals

The copper-gold mine is operated by OZ Minerals.

In August 2010 Rann opened the Cairn Hill iron ore/copper/gold mine operated by IMX Resources near Coober Pedy. It was the first new iron ore mining area opened in South Australia since the 19th century. Due to low iron ore prices, the Cairn Hill mine was closed in June 2014. It was sold to Cu-River Mining who reopened the mine in 2016.

Oil reserves 
In 2013, a potentially significant tight oil (oil trapped in oil-bearing shales) resource was found near the outskirts of Coober Pedy in the Arckaringa Basin.

Tourism
The town has become a popular stopover point and tourist destination, especially since 1987, when the sealing of the Stuart Highway was completed.

Coober Pedy today relies as much on tourism as the opal mining industry to provide the community with employment and sustainability. Visitors' attractions in Coober Pedy include the mines, the graveyard and the underground churches (the Serbian Orthodox Church and the Catholic Church). There are several motels offering underground accommodation, ranging from a few rooms to the entire motel being a dug-out. The hybrid Coober Pedy Solar Power Station supplies power to the off-grid area.

The Umoona Opal Mine and Museum is a popular attraction.

Heritage sites 
Coober Pedy has a number of heritage-listed sites, including:

 13 Hutchison Street: Three-Roomed Dugout
 9 Hutchison Street: Coober Pedy Catholic Church and Presbytery

Amenities and services
The Umoona Tjutagku Health Service Aboriginal Corporation (UTHSAC) was established in 2005 to provide health services for local Aboriginal people.

Local media 
Coober Pedy is home to the Coober Pedy Regional Times, a free community publication released fortnightly since 15 March 2001. Under a previous name, it had begun as a newsletter called the Coober Pedy Times, which was first issued in August 1982, itself continuing from a publication known as "Opal Chips". After some financial difficulties, the Times was bought by its editor, Margaret McKay, in 2006 and now includes online versions.

Sport and recreation 
The local golf course – mostly played at night with glowing balls, to avoid daytime heat – is completely free of grass, and golfers take a small piece of "turf" around to use for teeing off. As a result of correspondence between the two clubs, the Coober Pedy golf club is the only club in the world to enjoy reciprocal rights at The Royal and Ancient Golf Club of St Andrews.

The town also has an Australian rules football club, the Coober Pedy Saints, established in 2004, which competes in the Far North Football League (formerly the Woomera & Districts Football League).

The town has a drive-in theatre. It opened in 1965, but became less popular after 1980 with the arrival of television to the town, and ceased regular operation in 1984. It was re-opened in 1996.

Art centre

A board for the Umoona Community Art Centre was established in 2021, but needs government funding to establish a permanent location in the town. A group of highly talented artists has joined the APY Art Centre Collective, which helps to create employment opportunities for Indigenous artists in the region. An exhibition in the Adelaide gallery of the collective in September 2021 featured the work of 24 of these artists.

In philately 
A rare exhibition cachet, signed by Coober Pedy postmaster Alfred P. North, was discovered in Memphis, Tennessee by philatelist David Saks on 3 February 2016. To date, it is the only known example of this cachet in the world.

In popular culture 

Both the town and its hinterland, for different reasons, are photogenic and have attracted film makers. The town itself was the setting for:

 Fire in the Stone (1984)
 Until the End of the World (1991)
 Opal Dream (2006)

Its environment has also attracted movie producers, with parts of these movies filmed in the area:

 Mad Max Beyond Thunderdome (1985)
 Ground Zero (1987)
 The Blood of Heroes (1989)
 The Adventures of Priscilla, Queen of the Desert (1994)
 Pitch Black (2000)
 Red Planet (2000)
 Kangaroo Jack (2003)
 The Osiris Child: Science Fiction Volume One (2016)
 Instant Hotel Season 2 (2018)
 Mortal Kombat (2021)
The town is featured in the 2016 racing game Forza Horizon 3 and is the location of the Horizon Outback Festival.

Climate 

Coober Pedy experiences a hot desert climate (Köppen: BWh, Trewartha: BWhl), with very hot, dry summers; mild to hot, dry springs and autumns; and mild, dry winters. Precipitation is well-distributed through the year, although the lowest amounts are recorded in the winter months.

Coober Pedy was flooded when  of rainfall was recorded in 24 hours (which is over three-quarters of the mean annual rainfall) on 10 April 2014.

Transport 

The town is served by daily coach services from Adelaide by Greyhound Australia. The Ghan train serves the town through the Manguri Siding,  from Coober Pedy, which is served by trains once weekly in each direction. Passengers on The Ghan are not usually allowed to disembark at Manguri unless they have prearranged transport, due to the siding's isolation and the extremely cold temperatures at night.

Coober Pedy is a gateway to the outback communities of Oodnadatta and William Creek, which are both located on the Oodnadatta Track. There is a twice-a-week mail run from Coober Pedy to these communities and other outback homesteads. It carries the mail, general freight and passengers.

Regional Express also has direct flights to Adelaide, from Coober Pedy Airport.

See also 
 Kupa Piti Kungka Tjuta

References

External links 

 
  (Coober Pedy Retail, Business & Tourism Association)

Archived at Ghostarchive and the Wayback Machine: 

Far North (South Australia)
Mining towns in South Australia
Underground cities